The Infrastructure Act 2015 is a wide-ranging piece of planning and infrastructure legislation passed by the Parliament of the United Kingdom during David Cameron's administration. The act targets "transport, energy provision, housing development and nationally significant infrastructure projects", and has been the subject of some degree of controversy.

Environmental issues
The Infrastructure Act 2015 seeks to include safeguards around hydraulic fracturing. Opponents to hydraulic fracturing claim that the definition of hydraulic fracturing used by the bill is too exclusive based on existing hydraulic fracturing operations. Specifically, it is claimed that the requirement for ten thousand cubic metres of fluid total or one thousand cubic metres of fluid per stage or expected stage is too high, and that it is a greater amount of fluid than the amount used at the Preese Hall shale well.

Preese Hall is a particularly sensitive point of comparison for political opponents of hydraulic fracturing, as the minor earthquakes around the Preese Hall shale well were widely reported.
Other areas of the Infrastructure Act 2015 closely related to environmental issues include sections on Renewable Heat Incentives, off-site carbon abatement measures and cycling and walking investment strategies, making environmental issues a significant focus of the Act.

Development
The Infrastructure Act 2015 is especially relevant to development and planning law around development. An explicit aim of the legislation was to increase housing development within Britain, which became an increasingly important political issue in the beginning of the twenty-first century.
In addition to housing, key UK development and planning issues were addressed within the Act by efforts "to make provision about nationally significant infrastructure projects...to make provision about town and country planning...to make provision about the Homes and Communities Agency and Mayoral development corporations...to make provision for giving members of communities the right to buy stakes in local renewable electricity generation facilities".

Provisions

Part 6 Energy

Recovery of UK petroleum (sections 41 and 42)
Clauses on maximizing economic recovery of UK petroleum.

Petroleum and geothermal energy in deep-level land (sections 43 to 48)
Section 43 permits fracking without consent under 'landward areas' in England and Wales, below a surface level of 300 meters. The legislation is limited to the petroleum and geothermal industries.

Other provision about onshore petroleum (sections 49 and 50)
Clauses on meeting climate change requirements. Section 50 appends section 4 of the Petroleum Act 1998. It defines 'associated hydraulic fracturing' as more than 1,000 cubic metres of fluid per stage, or more than 10,000 cubic metres of fluid in total. In addition, conditions were attached that mean no fracking can take place at a depth shallower than 1,000 meters, and that soil and air monitoring must be put in place. The regulations state that "The associated hydraulic fracturing will not take place within protected groundwater source areas". 'Groundwater protection source area' does not appear to be defined.

See also
 Hydraulic fracturing in the United Kingdom

References

Further reading
 The Infrastructure Act 2015 (Commencement No.1) Regulations 2015
 The Petroleum Licensing (Exploration and Production) (Landward Areas) Regulations 2014

2015 in British law
2015 in the environment
Law of the United Kingdom
Environmental law in the United Kingdom
Town and country planning in the United Kingdom
United Kingdom Acts of Parliament 2015